Sneha Khanwalkar is an Indian music director who works in Hindi films. She is best known for her score for the film, Oye Lucky! Lucky Oye!, and also for Gangs of Wasseypur Part 1, Part 2. She had been nominated in Best Music Director category at the 58th Filmfare Awards for Gangs of Wasseypur Part 1 & Part 2 (credited as music director of Gangs of Wasseypur). She is only the second woman to gain a nomination in this category 28 years after Usha Khanna.

Early life and education
Born and brought up in Indore, where her mother's family was entrenched in the Gwalior gharana of Hindustani classical music, through which she learned music as a child.

During her HSC vacations, she did an animation course and art direction course. In 2001, her family moved to Mumbai, with an aim of her joining an engineering college, but instead she started working in animation followed by art direction before deciding on music direction as a career, after rediscovering her childhood passion for music.

Career
In 2004, she scored the movie The Hope, which competed at the Internationales Filmfest Emden in Germany. Meanwhile, she also did the title track for Ruchi Narain's film, KAL – Yesterday and Tomorrow (2005), though her big break came when she composed music for the 2007 movie Go, produced by Ram Gopal Varma, and also got to compose a song for  Sarkar Raj (2008).

In 2008, she won accolades for her score for the film, Oye Lucky! Lucky Oye! for which she travelled through rural North India, especially Haryana, where she visited the Raagini music festival, while researching for the film's music, eventually she created a hit soundtrack, embellished with Haryanvi musical influences.
 
She was the music director of Anurag Kashyap's celebrated movie Gangs of Wasseypur (Part 1 & Part 2), for which she was nominated in Best Music Director category at the 58th Filmfare Awards.

Sound Trippin

She was also the host of a popular music-based MTV mini-series called Sound Trippin in which she travels to places like Punjab, Banaras, Yellapur (North Canara, Karnataka), Goa, Leh, etc. collecting local sounds both ambient and everyday singers to local musicians, and creating a final piece of music that resonates the feel and the sounds from that location. The show is shot by Babble Fish Productions

Episode 1 – Tung Tung - Punjab (Qila Raipur Rural olympics)
Episode 2 – Ram Ram - Benaras
Episode 3 – Yere Yere - Yellapura (North Kanara, Karnataka)
Episode 4 – Susegaado - Goa
Episode 5 – Phinger Song - Kanpur
Episode 6 – Review of All Episodes
Episode 7 – Majuli(Assam)
Episode 8 – Scrap Rap - Dharavi (A Slum in Mumbai)
Episode 9 – Ghumma - Mumbai
Episode 10 – Babu - Kolkata
Episode 11 – Ju Ju Leh - Leh

Filmography

Movie music composer

Web series music composer

TV Show
 2012 - MTV Sound Trippin

References

External links

Living people
Musicians from Indore
Women film score composers
Indian women composers
Hindi film score composers
Women musicians from Madhya Pradesh
21st-century Indian composers
21st-century Indian women musicians
1983 births
21st-century women composers